Let's Play Gaming Expo is a gaming convention started in 2015. It is a three-day convention that is usually held annually in the Summer in Irving, Texas. It's a very interactive convention that specialized in gaming including board, card, and video.

There was no expo in 2020 as the COVID-19 pandemic was to blame.

Event History

References

Gaming conventions
Recurring events established in 2015
2015 establishments in Texas
Annual events in Texas
Conventions in Texas
Festivals in Texas
Culture of Dallas
Tourist attractions in Dallas